Microsoft SharePoint Designer (SPD), formerly known as Microsoft Office SharePoint Designer, is a discontinued HTML editor freeware for creating or modifying Microsoft SharePoint sites, workflows and web pages. It is a part of Microsoft SharePoint family of products. SharePoint Designer 2007 is a part of Microsoft Office 2007 family, but is not included in any of the Microsoft Office suites. SharePoint Designer 2013 is the last version of this product.

History
SharePoint Designer and its sister product, Microsoft Expression Web, are successors of Microsoft FrontPage. While Expression Web serves as the full-featured successor to FrontPage, SharePoint Designer focuses on designing and customizing Microsoft SharePoint websites. For instance, it only includes SharePoint-specific site templates. The first version, SharePoint Designer 2007, retains more FrontPage features than Expression Web (such as web components, database, marquee, hit counter, navigation bars and map insert). SharePoint Designer 2007 was initially a commercial software product. On March 31, 2009, however, SharePoint Designer 2007 was made available as freeware.

On April 24, 2009, Microsoft released SharePoint Designer 2007 Service Pack 2. On April 21, 2010, SharePoint Designer 2010 was released and made available for download. On October 24, 2011, Microsoft released SharePoint Designer 2007 Service Pack 3.

SharePoint Designer 2010, the successor to SharePoint Designer 2007, was released to web on April 21, 2010 in two flavors for IA-32 and x64 CPUs. Unlike its predecessor, however, it does not operate in absence of Microsoft SharePoint Server or Microsoft SharePoint Foundation and therefore cannot be used as a generic HTML editor.

On October 30, 2012, Microsoft released SharePoint Designer 2013. This is the last version of SharePoint Designer; following the announcement of SharePoint 2016 in Ignite 2015 conference, Mark Kashman, Senior Product Manager of Microsoft, announced that a corresponding SharePoint Designer would not be released with this product. The last update for SharePoint Designer was released on August 2, 2016.

In the Spring of 2018, Microsoft's documentation indicates that Microsoft Flow will be the workflow designer and engine going forward for providing customization to SharePoint workflows.

Features
SharePoint Designer shares its codebase, user interface and HTML rendering engine with Expression Web, and does not rely on Internet Explorer's Trident engine. It features a workflow designer that allows users of SharePoint to create workflow so that workflow can automate the process with the concept and objects such as list item, content type, and list column within SharePoint server. Starting from SharePoint 2013, it provides a text-based designer and a visual designer for non-developer users.

References

Further reading

External links

Microsoft SharePoint Designer Team Blog

HTML editors
SharePoint Designer
SharePoint Designer
Windows-only freeware